Sugar Lake is a lake in Wright County, in the U.S. state of Minnesota.

Sugar Lake was named for groves of sugar maple trees near its shores.

See also
List of lakes in Minnesota

References

Lakes of Minnesota
Lakes of Wright County, Minnesota